Mallwitz is a German language habitational surname. Notable people with the name include:
 Alfred Mallwitz (1919–1986), victim of witch hunts in Neustettin
 Arthur Mallwitz (1880–1968), German athlete
 Joana Mallwitz (born 1986), German conductor and pianist
 Lenigret Mallwitz (1892–1969), German painter

References 

German-language surnames
German toponymic surnames
Germanized Slavic family names